Idwal is Welsh for "lord of the wall". As a masculine given name, it may refer to the following people:

Middle Ages
Ordered chronologically
 Idwal Iwrch (reigned c. 655–682), King of Gwynedd
 Idwal or Ithel ap Morgan, 8th century King of Gwent and Glywysing
 Idwal Foel (died c. 942), King of Gwynned
 Idwal ap Idwal, better known as Ieuaf ap Idwal (ruled 950–969), joint king of Gwynedd (with his father Idwal Foel) and possibly Powys
 Idwal ap Meurig (died 997), King of Gwynedd

Modern world
Ordered alphabetically
 Idwal Davies (footballer) (1899–1980), Welsh footballer
 Idwal Davies (rugby) (1915–1990), Welsh dual-code rugby player
 Idwal H. Edwards (1895–1981), United States Air Force lieutenant general
 Idwal Fisher (1935–2012), Welsh rugby union and rugby league footballer
 Idwal Jones (writer) (1887–1964), novelist and non-fiction writer
 Idwal Jones (novelist) (1887–1964), Welsh-American novelist and non-fiction writer
 Idwal Jones (politician) (1900–1982), Welsh politician
 Idwal Jones (writer) (1895–1937), Welsh schoolmaster, poet and dramatist
 Idwal Pugh (1918–2010), Welsh civil servant
 Idwal Rees (1910–1991), Welsh international rugby union centre
 Idwal Robling (1927–2011), Welsh sports commentator

Welsh masculine given names